The Four Hundred was a list of New York society during the Gilded Age, a group that was led by Caroline Schermerhorn Astor, the "Mrs. Astor", for many years.  After her death, her role in society was filled by three women: Mamie Fish, Theresa Fair Oelrichs, and Alva Belmont, known as the "triumvirate" of American society.

On February 16, 1892, The New York Times published the "official" list of those included in the Four Hundred as dictated by social arbiter Ward McAllister, Mrs. Astor's friend and confidant, in response to lists proffered by others, and after years of clamoring by the press to know who, exactly, was on the list.

History
In the decades following the American Civil War, the population of New York City grew almost exponentially, and immigrants and wealthy  arrivistes from the Midwestern United States began challenging the dominance of the old New York Establishment.  Aided by McAllister, Mrs. Astor attempted to codify proper behavior and etiquette, as well as determine who was acceptable among the arrivistes, as champions of old money and tradition.

Reportedly, Ward McAllister coined the phrase "the Four Hundred" by declaring that there were "only 400 people in fashionable New York Society."  According to him, this was the number of people in New York who really mattered; the people who felt at ease in the ballrooms of high society.  In 1888, McAllister told the New-York Tribune that "If you go outside that number," he warned, "you strike people who are either not at ease in a ballroom or else make other people not at ease."

While the number four hundred has popularly been linked to the capacity of Mrs. Astor's ballroom at her large brownstone home at 350 Fifth Avenue and East 34th Street (today the site of the Empire State Building), the exact origins remain unknown.  There were, however, other lists in New York around the same time which necessitated a maximum capacity of four hundred, including Delmonico's restaurant and local cotillion dances, that may have contributed to the particular sum of four hundred.

February 1892 list

In response to competing lists naming the purported members of New York society published in the New York World that insisted New York society was, in fact, made up of only 150 people, McAllister spoke with the Times, refuting the World article and giving the paper the "official list", which was published on February 16, 1892 and quoted McAllister stating:

The so-called Four Hundred has not been cut down or dwindled to 150 names. The nonsense, don't you know, printed to that effect in the World and some other papers, has made a very bad impression that will reflect badly against them, you understand. That list of names, you understand, printed on Sunday, did not come from me, don't you see. It is unauthorized, don't you see. But it is accurate as far as it goes, you understand.

It is incomplete and does injustice, you understand, to many eligible millionaires. Think of leaving out such names, don't you know, as Chauncey M. Depew, Gen. Alexander S. Webb, Mr. and Mrs. Edward Cooper, Mr. and Mrs. Luther Kountze, Mr. and Mrs. Robert Goelet, Mr. and Miss Wilson, Miss Greene, and many others! Don't you understand, it is absurd, senseless.

Let me explain, don't you know. There are three dinner dances, don't you know, during the season, and the invitations, don't you see, are issued to different ladies and gentlemen each time, do you understand? So at each dinner dance, you know, are only 150 people of the highest set, don't you know. So, during the season, you see, 400 different invitations are issued.

Wait a moment and I will give you a correct list, don't you know, of the people who form what is known as the Four Hundred. Do you understand it will be authorized, reliable, and, don’t you know, the only correct list.

The list, purported to include the crème de la crème of New York society, consisted largely of "bankers, lawyers, brokers, real estate men, and railroaders, with one editor (Paul Dana of The New York Sun), one publisher, one artist, and two architects."  It also included a mix of both "Nobs" and "Swells". "Nobs" came from old money (including the Astors, the Goelets, the Livingstons, and the Van Rensselaers), and "Swells" were representatives of the nouveau riche, who Mrs. Astor felt, begrudgingly, were able to partake in polite society (best personified by the Vanderbilt family).

Criticism and backlash

After McAllister released the names of the Four Hundred in The New York Times, there was significant backlash, both against the idea of a definitive list of "acceptable society" and McAllister himself.  The papers dubbed him "Mr. Make-a-Lister" and, in combination with his memoirs published in 1890, entitled Society as I Have Found It, further ostracized him from the "old guard", who valued their privacy in an era when the leaders of society were the equivalent of modern movie stars.  William d'Alton Mann, who owned Town Topics, a gossip magazine, considered it his duty to expose the sins of society and regularly criticized the Four Hundred.

Several years later, author O. Henry released a collection of short stories, entitled The Four Million, a reaction to this phrase, expressing his opinion that every human being in New York was worthy of notice.

In 2009, the Museum of the City of New York compiled its own list, entitled "The New York City 400", of the 400 "movers and shakers" who made a difference in the 400 years of New York City history since Henry Hudson arrived in 1609.  McAllister was "the only person on the original Four Hundred to also make the museum's list."

Named members of "the Four Hundred"

Besides containing far fewer than 400 people, McAllister's list "abounded in inaccuracies: names were misspelled or incomplete and many spouses omitted or included although they were dead."  The rules of the time dictated that "only the eldest unmarried daughter of a family carried the title "Miss," with no given name," but he regularly ignored the rule.

See also
 Bradley-Martin Ball
 List of Gilded Age mansions

References
Notes

Sources

External links
 Patterson, Jerry E. The First Four Hundred: Mrs. Astor's New York in the Gilded Age, Rizzoli, New York (2000) 

Gilded Age
Wealth in the United States
High society (social class)
American upper class
Upper class culture in the United States
Cultural history of New York City
Social class in the United States
Class-related slurs
People included in New York Society's Four Hundred
History of women in New York City
Upper class culture in New York City
New York City-related lists